An open university is a university with an open-door academic policy, with minimal or no entry requirements. Open universities may employ specific teaching methods, such as open supported learning or distance education. However, not all open universities focus on distance education, nor do distance-education universities necessarily have open admission policies.

History
A precursor to the open university was the University of London External study system established in 1858; the university was a degree-awarding examination board and welcomed anyone who could meet its entry requirements and pay the requisite fees, including students from anywhere in the world. Participants could continue to earn a living while they studied, could learn in any way they wished, and could sit their examinations without visiting Britain. A similar establishment was the Royal University of Ireland, founded in 1879 as an examining and degree-awarding university based on the University of London model. Examinations were open to external candidates in addition to those that attended lectures at participant colleges; many schools and convents entered their students for both advanced and degree-level examinations. Many of the early graduates were women, because Trinity College Dublin did not admit women until twenty years later.

The University of the Cape of Good Hope, later to become University of South Africa (UNISA), was created in 1873, and had a similar model to the University of London. It had no students, instead setting academic standards and acting as an examination board for associated university colleges. By 1946, these colleges were becoming independent universities, and UNISA began to offer postal tuition. In apartheid South Africa, it offered educational opportunities to all ethnicities, but students had to meet normal matriculation requirements. There was very little student support, and the drop-out rate was high, particularly among black South Africans. By the new millennium, around 400,000 students in 130 countries were taking its courses, and it had become one of the largest distance learning institutions in the world.

In the Soviet Union in the late 1950s, Nikita Khrushchev significantly extended higher education using a system of correspondence courses with part-time education, in which students took part while remaining in the workplace. By 1965, there were 1.7 million students in this part-time/consultation model, 1.6 million full time students, and 0.5 million students taking evening classes. The support given enabled working-class students, at little cost to themselves, to become useful functionaries and members of the Communist party. With the break-up of the Soviet Union in the 1990s, the state no longer had need of the cadre of functionaries and the system collapsed.

The first European open university was the Open University in the United Kingdom which was established in 1969. It aimed to widen access to the highest standards of scholarship in higher education; it uses a variety of methods for teaching, including written, audio and visual materials, the Internet, disc-based software and television programmes on DVD. Course-based television broadcasts by the BBC continued until 15 December 2006.

In 1974, Asia's first open university was founded in Islamabad, Pakistan as the Allama Iqbal Open University (AIOU). Since its inception, it has become Pakistan's largest university by active enrollment at 1,027,000. AIOU was developed on Open University's model and success. Following this, similar models were implemented in other South Asian countries with the establishment of Indira Gandhi National Open University (1985) and Bangladesh Open University (1992).

The National University of Distance Education (UNED) was established in Spain in 1972. Its distance learning model provided higher education for those who had been excluded from the existing catholic establishments. It was a national university and had a government-imposed curriculum. The language of instruction was Spanish, and UNED faced hostility from the Basque and Catalan regions. In fact Catalonia set up its own distance learning centre in 1995, the Open University of Catalonia, with instruction in both languages.

See also
 List of open universities
 Open admissions

References

Further reading
 
 

 
Types of university or college